Nottingham Trent University is a tram stop on Nottingham Express Transit (NET) in the city of Nottingham suburb of the Arboretum. It is located in the centre of Nottingham Trent University's city campus, between the Boots Library and the Chaucer Building. The university's flagship Arkwright and Newton buildings are nearby to the south, although Newton is closer to the Royal Centre stop. On either side of the stop, the tram tracks share the road with other traffic, but only trams are permitted to pass through the stop itself. The stop has two side platforms on either side of the twin tracks.

The tram stop opened on 9 March 2004, along with the rest of NET's initial system.

With the opening of NET's phase two, Nottingham Trent University is now on the common section of the NET, where line 1, between Hucknall and Chilwell, and line 2, between Phoenix Park and Clifton, operate together. Trams on each line run at frequencies that vary between 4 and 8 trams per hour, depending on the day and time of day, combining to provide up to 16 trams per hour on the common section.

Gallery

References

External links

Nottingham Express Transit stops
Nottingham Trent University
Railway stations in Great Britain opened in 2004